Eugnosta sartana, the broad-patch carolella moth, is a species of moth of the  family Tortricidae. It is found from Pennsylvania to Florida and from Missouri to Texas.

The wingspan is 10–15 mm. The forewings are light brown with two large dark brown patches in median and subterminal areas. Adults have been recorded year round in the southern part of the range. In the north, the main flight time ranges from April to November.

References

Moths described in 1823
Eugnosta